Orange is the New Brown is an Australian sketch comedy television series on the Seven Network.

Orange is the New Brown is written by Nazeem Hussain, Joel Slack Smith, Sophie Braham, Richard Thorp, Penny Greenhalgh and Heidi Regan. It is produced by Screentime.

Cast
 Nazeem Hussain 
 Urzila Carlson
 Becky Lucas
 Matt Okine
 Broden Kelly
 Aaron Chen

Guests
 Kat Stewart
 Claudia Karvan
 Tim Minchin
 Gary Sweet
 Firass Dirani
 Sigrid Thornton

References

External links 
 

2018 Australian television series debuts
Seven Network original programming
English-language television shows
Australian television sketch shows
Television series by Screentime